Strikeforce/M-1 Global: Fedor vs. Rogers was a mixed martial arts event held on November 7, 2009 promoted by Strikeforce in association with M-1 Global.  It was the first MMA event on network television since the now-defunct EliteXC promotion broadcast its final event, EliteXC: Heat, on CBS on October 4, 2008. The event had a four-fight main card with a broadcasting team of Gus Johnson, Frank Shamrock and Mauro Ranallo. The event drew an estimated 4,040,000 viewers, with a peak at 5,460,000 on CBS.

Background
Gegard Mousasi was originally slated to defend his Strikeforce Light Heavyweight Championship, but eventually competed in a non-title bout.

A previously announced bout between Bobby Lashley and Ron Waterman was announced to have moved to a later date, though it never officially took place.

A women's bout between Marloes Coenen and Erin Toughill was set to serve as a reserve fight, but was cancelled when Toughill withdrew due to an undisclosed medical condition.  Roxanne Modafferi stepped in to fight Coenen on this show.

EA Sports showed a preview trailer for the new EA Sports MMA game coming out in 2010 during the event.

A welterweight bout between Mark Miller and Deray Davis was scheduled for the undercard, but was canceled due to time issues.

Results

See also
 Strikeforce (mixed martial arts)
 List of Strikeforce champions
 List of Strikeforce events
 2009 in Strikeforce

Television ratings
In terms of ratings, the show averaged 3.79 million viewers for the allotted 9-11pm running time.  The main event, which took place after 11pm, peaked at 5.46 million viewers.  Overall, the two-hour-plus broadcast averaged 4.04 million viewers and a 2.5 household rating.

References

Fedor vs. Rogers
M-1 Global events
2009 in mixed martial arts
Mixed martial arts in Illinois
2009 in sports in Illinois
Events in Hoffman Estates, Illinois